The 2011–12 Georgia Southern Eagles men's basketball team represents Georgia Southern University during the 2011–12 NCAA Division I men's basketball season. The Eagles, led by third-year head coach Charlton Young, play their home games at Hanner Fieldhouse and are members of the South Division of the Southern Conference.

Roster

Schedule

|-
!colspan=9| Exhibition

|-
!colspan=9| Regular Season

|-
!colspan=9| SoCon tournament

References

Georgia Southern
Georgia Southern Eagles men's basketball seasons